The 1981 Australian Football Championships Night Series was the 3rd edition of the AFC Night Series, a VFL-organised national club Australian rules football tournament between the leading clubs from the VFL, the SANFL, the WAFL and State Representative Teams.

A total of 34 teams from across Australia played 35 matches over five months, with the qualifying rounds held during the pre-season and the main draw held midweek throughout the premiership season.

Qualified Teams

1 Includes previous appearances in the Championship of Australia and NFL Night Series.

Venues

Knockout stage

Round 1

Round 2

Round 2 Playoff

Round 3

Quarter-finals

Semi-finals

Australian Football Championships Night Series final

References

Australian rules interstate football
History of Australian rules football
Australian rules football competitions in Australia
1981 in Australian rules football